Dennis Doyle (born 1949) is an American politician and former mayor of Beaverton, Washington County, Oregon. Doyle served as a Beaverton city councilor for 14 years before being elected mayor of the city in 2008, succeeding Rob Drake in January 2009.

Early life
Born in Chicago in about 1949, he earned a bachelor of arts in political science from Illinois State University. He is married to Ann Doyle for over 34 years, Doyle has two daughters, both married, as well as four granddaughters. Doyle moved to Beaverton in the 1980s, where he was a certified teacher and sports coach, previously coaching softball and soccer for Valley Catholic High School.

Political career
Doyle, a Democrat who was originally elected in 2008, was reelected in 2012. He ran unopposed for a third term in 2016. In September 2019, he announced that he intended to run for reelection in the May 2020 primary election, for a fourth term. He was involved in many climate change and environmental issues as mayor, and taking part in several environmental organizations. Doyle was defeated by challenger Lacey Beaty in the November 2020 election in a run off. Beaty's term in office began January 1, 2021.

Felony charge
On March 3 2022, Doyle was charged in federal court with one felony count of possession of child pornography, which carries up to 20 years in prison and/or a fine of up to $250,000.  Doyle allegedly had the child pornography in his possession between 2014 and 2015, including sexually explicit material depicting minors under the age of 12. He made his initial appearance at Gus J. Solomon United States Courthouse on March 4, 2022. Doyle pleaded guilty to a single charge of possession of child pornography on October 11, 2022. On January 24, 2023, Doyle was sentenced to six months in prison and five years of supervised release.

References

External links
 Mayor's website

1949 births
Living people
Mayors of places in Oregon
Politicians from Beaverton, Oregon
Oregon Democrats
Illinois State University alumni
Politicians from Chicago
Educators from Oregon
21st-century American politicians
Oregon politicians convicted of crimes
American people convicted of child pornography offenses
American sex offenders